Rudhramadevi is the soundtrack to the 2015 Telugu historical film of the same name directed by Gunasekhar. The film stars Anushka Shetty, Allu Arjun, Rana Daggubati and Krishnam Raju. The soundtrack album and background score were composed by Ilaiyaraaja. The audio music was planned to release separately in Telangana and Andhra Pradesh states having the Chief ministers of these states as chief guests. The songs were released simultaneously in Visakhapatnam and Warangal on 25 July 2015.

On 31 July 2015, Deccan Music named it as the Best Telugu Album of the month. The soundtrack for the Tamil version were released on 15 August 2015 and the Malayalam version was released on 4 September 2015, respectively.

Track listing

References

2015 soundtrack albums
Telugu film soundtracks
Action film soundtracks
Ilaiyaraaja soundtracks
Hindi film soundtracks